Game Center is a service by Apple that allows users to play and challenge friends when playing online multiplayer social gaming network games. Games can now share multiplayer functionality between the Mac and iOS versions of the app. 

Game Center can be implemented by developers as of iOS 4.1 or later, and macOS 10.12 or later, through the GameKit framework. Game Center is available on iPod Touch 2nd generation and later (iOS 4.1 or higher required); iPhone 3GS and later (iOS 4.1 or higher required); all models of the iPad (iOS 4.2 or higher required); Mac computers running macOS 10.12 Sierra or later, Apple TV 4 running tvOS, and Apple Watch running watchOS 3.

History 
Gaming became a significant part of the iOS platform when Apple launched the App Store on July 10, 2008. Unlike the console systems that were currently on the market, Apple had no unified multiplayer and social structure for their platform. This gap was soon filled by third parties, such as OpenFeint, Plus, AGON Online, and Scoreloop. These third parties had control over the online gaming environment, and with multiple third parties involved, it left a non-unified experience.

Game Center was announced during an iOS 4 preview event hosted by Apple on April 8, 2010. A preview was released to registered Apple developers in August. It was released on September 8, 2010 with iOS 4.1 on iPhone 4, iPhone 3GS, and iPod Touch 2nd generation through 4th generation, and is included with iOS 4.2 or later on the iPad.

An updated version of Game Center was released with iOS 5 that featured the addition of turn-based gaming, player photos, friend suggestions, and achievement points. The iOS 6 update added Challenges, a way for players to challenge other players to beat leaderboard scores or earn achievements.

On June 13, 2016, the application was removed from iOS 10 and macOS Sierra; however, the service still exists, and users now manage their Game Center profile from within the Settings app. On June 24, 2020, Game Center returned and was refreshed and redesigned in iOS 14, iPadOS 14 and macOS Big Sur. On July 14, 2021, a Game Center widget was introduced in different sizes in iOS 15, iPadOS 15 and macOS Monterey.

From within Game Center, players can connect with friends, send friend requests, start playing games and organize online multiplayer games. The number of friends that can be connected to a single Game Center account is limited to 500. Some games may feature achievements, where for completing a specific task, the player is rewarded points. Depending on the game, a leaderboard may be present where a player can compare his or her score with friends or the world.

Many iOS games use Game Center, but not all of them use every feature. Apps can choose to include any or all of the following features supported by Game Center:

Leaderboards – compares scores with the player's friends and with other players from around the world.
Achievements – Points are awarded to players as a part of Game Center's achievement tracking system. Players can earn points by meeting specific in-game challenges. Players cannot use the point for anything other than to rate progress in games. It was developed so players can socialize and compete against each other.
Multiplayer – the game can host matches in real-time, either between the player's friends or by "auto-matching" with random players from around the world.

See also
 Google Play Games
 Xbox Live
Social network game – online games played through social networks

References

External links 
 Implementing a Facebook Leaderboard In a Mobile Game at How to Make Games

Apple Inc. services
IOS
Multiplayer video game services
Online video game services